The NWA Florida Global Tag Team Championship was a major tag team title in Florida Championship Wrestling from 1982 until fall 1983, when it was replaced by the NWA Florida United States Tag Team Championship.

Title history

See also
List of National Wrestling Alliance championships
Florida Championship Wrestling
NWA Florida United States Tag Team Championship

Notes

References

Championship Wrestling from Florida championships
National Wrestling Alliance championships
Tag team wrestling championships
State professional wrestling championships
Professional wrestling in Florida